Pacific Palisades is a neighborhood in the Westside region of Los Angeles, California, situated about  west of Downtown Los Angeles.

Pacific Palisades was formally founded in 1921 by a Methodist organization, and in the years that followed became a refuge for Jewish artists and intellectuals fleeing the Holocaust. The Palisades would later be sought after by celebrities and other high-profile individuals seeking privacy. It is known for: its seclusion and for being a close-knit community with a small-town feel, its Mediterranean climate, hilly topography, natural environment, its abundance of parkland and hiking trails, its  strip of coastline, and for being home to a number of architecturally significant homes. As of 2021, the community's population was 22,977.

Pacific Palisades is a largely residential community and does not attract many tourists other than day visitors to Gladstones Malibu, the local beaches, the Getty Villa or the Self-Realization Fellowship Lake Shrine.

Beaches along the Pacific Palisades coast include: Will Rogers State Beach, Sunset Point Beach, and one of the few gay beaches in Los Angeles, Ginger Rogers Beach. The many parks within the Santa Monica Mountains National Recreation Area lie along the ridges above the community, along with local parks that include Will Rogers State Historic Park.

The Palisades is bounded by Brentwood to the east, Malibu to the west, Santa Monica to the southeast, the Santa Monica Bay to the southwest, Topanga and the Santa Monica Mountains to the north.

Etymology
The name "Pacific Palisades" comes from the term "palisades," a geological formation consisting of a series of cliff-like bluffs situated by a body of water, in this case the Pacific Ocean, and also for the area's purported resemblance to The Palisades on the west side of the lower Hudson River.

History

Native American period
Archeological evidence shows Native American Indians living in the Santa Monica Mountains and the surrounding area including Pacific Palisades for over 10,000 years. Prior to European contact, the western sections of the Santa Monica mountains were inhabited by the Tongva people. The closest Tongva settlement to Pacific Palisades with a written record is the village of Topa'nga. The village of Topa'nga sits on the western-most edge of Tongva territory, neighboring the territory of the Chumash people to the north. Due to this close proximity to the Chumash, the culture in western Tongva territory contained elements of Chumash influence.

Mexican period

The land that became Pacific Palisades was originally within the boundaries of Rancho Boca de Santa Monica, granted by the governor of California during the Mexican period to Francisco Marquez and Ysidro Reyes in 1839. The Ysidro Reyes Adobe was the first adobe home ever built in Santa Monica Canyon, erected in the year 1838 on land now known as Pampas Ricas Blvd in Pacific Palisades. Sketches of adobe dwelling exist in the collection of the UCLA Library. A memorial plaque sits in a boulder on Pampas Ricas Blvd commemorating the adobe house, dedicated in the 1950s. Ysidro Reyes died in 1863. Reyes left his portion of Rancho Boca de Santa Monica to his widow, Maria Antonia Villa, who sold it to developer and railroad magnate Robert Symington Baker in 1875.

1911-1922

In 1911, film director Thomas Ince constructed his film studio, "Inceville", which was on a  tract of land he leased called Bison Ranch at Sunset Blvd. and Pacific Coast Highway in the Santa Monica Mountains. Today this is where the Self-Realization Fellowship Lake Shrine is located. By the following year, Ince had earned enough money to purchase the ranch and was able to lease an additional  lot in what is now in the Palisades Highlands neighborhood. stretching  up Santa Ynez Canyon. This was the first major development built in the Palisades since the Mexican rancho era.

This was the first studio in the area which featured silent stages, production offices, printing labs, a commissary large enough to serve lunch to hundreds of workers, dressing rooms, props houses, elaborate sets, all in one central location.

When Inceville was completed, the streets were lined with many types of structures, from humble cottages to mansions, mimicking the style and architecture of different countries. Extensive outdoor western sets were built and used on the site for several years. According to Katherine La Hue in her book, Pacific Palisades: Where the Mountains Meet the Sea:

Ince invested $35,000 in building, stages and sets ... a bit of Switzerland, a Puritan settlement, a Japanese village ... beyond the breakers, an ancient brigantine weighed anchor, cutlassed men swarming over the sides of the ship, while on the shore performing cowboys galloped about, twirling their lassos in pursuit of errant cattle ... The main herds were kept in the hills, where Ince also raised feed and garden produce. Supplies of every sort were needed to house and feed a veritable army of actors, directors and subordinates.

While the cowboys, Native Americans and assorted workers lived at "Inceville," the main actors came from Los Angeles and other communities as needed, often taking the red trolley cars to the Long Wharf in what is now the Temescal Canyon neighborhood, where buckboards conveyed them to the set.

Ince lived in a house overlooking the vast studio in what is now the Marquez Knolls neighborhood. Indeed, "Inceville" became a prototype for Hollywood film studios of the future, with a studio head (Ince), producers, directors, production managers, production staff, and writers all working together under one organization and under the supervision of a General Manager, Fred J. Balshofer. On January 16, 1916, a fire broke out at Inceville, the first of many that eventually destroyed all of the buildings. Ince later gave up on the studio and sold it to Hart, who renamed it "Hartville." Three years later, Hart sold the lot to Robertson-Cole Pictures Corporation, which continued filming there until 1922. La Hue writes that "the place was virtually a ghost town when the last remnants of "Inceville" were burned on July 4, 1922, leaving only a "weatherworn old church, which stood sentinel over the charred ruins."

1921–1931

A decade later, the Rev. Charles H. Scott and the Southern California Methodist Episcopal Church bought the land; in 1922, Scott founded Pacific Palisades, envisioning an elaborate religious-intellectual commune.  Believers snapped up choice lots and lived in tents during construction. By 1925, the Palisades had 100 homes. In one subdivision, streets were named in alphabetical order for Methodist missionaries (the "Alphabet Streets"). The tents eventually were replaced by cabins, then by bungalows, and ultimately by multimillion-dollar homes. The climate of the area was a big selling point. Temperatures are much cooler than inland Los Angeles during summer, but usually sunnier and less foggy than areas south along the coast (e.g. Santa Monica).

Pacific Palisades enjoyed steady growth throughout the Roaring 20s, but it was still a small, isolated community out on the edge of Los Angeles. It began to become less isolated with the paving of Sunset Boulevard± in 1925, which brought an increased flow of traffic through the community and offered more convenient accessibility to nearby Westwood and Beverly Hills.

1929 would prove to be a pivotal year in the history of the Palisades, and by that time the town consisted of only about 365 homes and about 1,000 residents who mostly resided in the so-called "Alphabet Streets" neighborhood, although residential construction was now expanding into what would later become the Castellammare, Huntington and Paseo Miramar neighborhoods. On August 18 of that year, the cornerstone was laid for the foundation of the Methodist Episcopal Church on Via de la Paz, which at that time was the community's only church. Directly across the street, planning was underway for the town's first permanent school building which would later become known as "Palisades Elementary", which was dedicated on June 12, 1931.

In 1928, the Los Angeles Police Department began renting temporary office space in the now-historic Business Block building for the price of $10 a month. The following year, a motorcycle officer was assigned to make nightly patrols in the area. The Palisades finally acquired its own fire station in 1929, located on Sunset, adjacent to where the local Chase Bank branch now stands in the Village neighborhood.

By the end of the decade, nearly all remaining open areas of Pacific Palisades were being developed, reflecting the areas booming growth and the Palisades' coastal allure. Golfers were enjoying the already acclaimed Riviera Country Club, opened in 1927. Later in the decade construction started on the Bel-Air Bay Club, opened in March 1930.

1930– present

The Palisades was a refuge for many German-Jewish and Austrian-Jewish intellectuals and artists fleeing from pre-war Germany and, later, from the Holocaust, many of whom associated with the Exilliteratur settled in Pacific Palisades, including Thomas Mann, Lion Feuchtwanger, Theodor W. Adorno, Vicki Baum, Herbert Zipper, and Emil Ludwig. Some of these Jewish refugees had previously sought refuge in the south of France (and had to flee due to the fall of France to the Vichy regime), and were surprised by the similarities with the Mediterranean climate and topography. Villa Aurora on Paseo Miramar, the Spanish colonial home of Feuchtwanger and his wife, Marta, became the focal point of the expatriate community, which was nicknamed "Weimar by the Sea". Some non-Jewish exiles who were married to people with Jewish ancestry chose to settle in the Palisades as well, such as Thomas Mann and his wife Katia Mann who resided at 1550 San Remo Drive in the Riviera neighborhood.

For many decades there was a virtual ban on drinking alcohol in the district, and a Chinese restaurant, House of Lee, held the only liquor license. The Methodist Church created a Chautauqua Conference Grounds in Temescal Canyon. The Presbyterian Synod purchased the property in 1943 and used it as a private retreat center until the Santa Monica Mountains Conservancy purchased the property in 1994 to become Temescal Gateway Park.

Though the Palisades had a notable Jewish population since at least the 1930s, it was still largely Methodist until the 1970s. This is when the Palisades began to see an explosion of affluent Jewish migration, accompanied by the opening of a local landmark Mort's Deli, in 1972. The beloved landmark closed in 2007 after former LA mayor Richard Riordan purchased the deli and converted it to a bistro.

Geography
The Santa Monica Mountain range runs through the northern and eastern sections of Pacific Palisades, accessible through a series of trailheads.

The Palisades covers an area slightly larger than the island of Manhattan.

Climate

Pacific Palisades has a Mediterranean climate (Köppen Csb), and receives just enough annual precipitation to avoid semi-arid climate (BSh),. Daytime temperatures are generally temperate all year round. In winter, they average around  giving it a tropical feel although it is a few degrees too cool to be a true tropical climate on average due to cool night temperatures. Pacific Palisades has plenty of sunshine throughout the year, with an average of only 35 days with measurable precipitation annually.

Temperatures in the Palisades exceed  on a dozen or so days in the year, from one day a month in April, May, June and November to three days a month in July, August, October and to five days in September. Hours of sunshine total more than 3,000 per year, from an average of 7 hours of sunshine per day in December to an average of 12 in July. Pacific Palisades, like much of the rest of the southern California coast, is subject to a late spring/early summer weather phenomenon called "June Gloom". This involves overcast or foggy skies in the morning that yield to sun by early afternoon.

Pacific Palisades averages  of precipitation annually, mainly occurring between November and March, generally in the form of moderate rain showers, but sometimes as heavy rainfall during winter storms. Rainfall is usually higher in the neighborhoods located in the hills and coastal slopes of the Santa Monica Mountains, such as the Highlands and Castellammare; due to orographic uplift. Summer days are typically rainless. Rarely, an incursion of moist air from the south or east can bring brief thunderstorms in late summer, especially to the mountains. The coast gets slightly less rainfall, while the inland and mountain areas get considerably more. Years of average rainfall are rare. Wet years are usually associated with warm water El Niño conditions in the Pacific, dry years with cooler water La Niña episodes. A series of rainy days can bring floods to the lowlands and mudslides to the hills, especially after wildfires have denuded the slopes.

Both freezing temperatures and snowfall are extremely rare in the hills and canyon ridges and along the coast, with the last occurrence of a  reading being on. While the most recent snowfall occurred in January 2021, it has also occurred several other times in recorded history, the second-most recent being in February 2019, with snow falling in some areas of the Palisades as recently as January 2021. During autumn and winter, Santa Ana winds sometimes bring much warmer and drier conditions to Pacific Palisades, and raise wildfire risk.

Neighborhoods

The Village
 
 
The Village is the Pacific Palisades' walkable, vibrant downtown area and small central business district with its center at Sunset Boulevard and Via de la Paz. Pacific Palisades has been known for having an abundance of Italian restaurants. The Village's anchor is the Palisades Village, a shopping center which was opened in 2018 and replaced a number of buildings in the downtown area. This business district is centered around the historic Business Block building located between Antioch and Sunset. The Village consists of a weekly farmers' market, restaurants, cafés, and coffee shops in addition to boutiques, shops, banks, offices, an Erewhon Market, Ralph's, a Gelson's, and a Starbucks, and local events.

The Alphabet Streets
The Alphabet Streets, also known as "The North Village," is the neighborhood that borders the 'village' proper to the north of Sunset Boulevard. This was the first neighborhood to be built in Pacific Palisades, beginning in 1921 by members of the Methodist movement. This neighborhood has the smallest lot sizes of all the neighborhoods in the Palisades, with lots ranging from 5,200 to 7,500 sq ft in size. The Alphabet Streets are within walking distance to The Village, and this area is characterized by its high density of smaller single family homes on lively narrow streets. The streets, named after Methodist Bishops of the late 19th and early 20th century, are consecutively named beginning with A, B, C, D, etc. – hence the name Alphabet Streets. This neighborhood is a destination for trick-or-treaters on Halloween.

The El Medio Mesa
The El Medio Mesa is located south of Sunset Boulevard beginning about a quarter mile west of The Village, across Temescal Canyon – just past Palisades Charter High School. The El Medio Mesa extends for a long distance from Temescal Canyon all the way to where Sunset Boulevard meets the Pacific Coast Highway.

Marquez Knolls
Marquez Knolls is a large area of homes located north of Sunset Boulevard beginning about a quarter mile west of The Village across Temescal Canyon on the mountain upslope known for spectacular ocean views. The lower upslope was first developed in the early 1950s and mid-1960s by the Earl Lachman family. There is a small shopping center on Marquez Street and Sunset Boulevard.

The Via Bluffs and the Huntington Palisades
The Via Bluffs and The Huntington Palisades are the neighborhoods that border the "village" proper to the south of Sunset Boulevard, overlooking the ocean. The Via Mesa is located between Temescal Canyon on the west and Potrero Canyon on the east; the Huntington Palisades is located between Potrero Canyon on the west and Chautauqua Boulevard on the east. Both of these neighborhoods are within walking distance to The Village and sit upon high bluffs that look out over the Pacific Ocean.

The El Medio Bluffs
The El Medio Bluffs, as with The Via Bluffs and The Huntington Palisades, The El Medio Bluffs are located on a high ridge overlooking the Pacific Ocean and much of the neighborhood is afforded ocean views and ocean air.

Castellammare
Castellammare is located along Pacific Coast Highway on small bluffs much closer to sea-level, north of where Sunset Boulevard meets PCH. This is the home of the Getty Villa and the narrow, winding streets in this neighborhood have Italian names and ocean breezes.

Rustic Canyon

Rustic Canyon is the neighborhood east of Chautauqua Boulevard that dips into Santa Monica Canyon and includes the Will Rogers State Historic Park. The neighborhood features post-war homes located on the former polo field of The Uplifters, the original site of The Uplifters clubhouse (now a city park), and "cabins" developed as second homes and weekend retreats. This area is also known as Uplifter's Ranch.

The Riviera

 
The Riviera is a Palisades neighborhood located approximately two miles east of The Palisades Village and features The Riviera Country Club, a high-end country club, and streets named after various locations in the French and Italian Riviera. The neighborhood is divided into north and south sections by Sunset Boulevard. It borders Santa Monica and Brentwood. The Riviera Country Club hosts the Genesis Open on the PGA Tour in February (the tournament has been previously known as the Northern Trust Open and Nissan Open and was originally the "Los Angeles Open"). Riviera has hosted three major championships: the U.S. Open in 1948 and the PGA Championship in 1983 and 1995. Ben Hogan won three times in less than 18 months at the course (1947 and 1948 L.A. Open, 1948 U.S. Open), and it became known as "Hogan's Alley." The country club will also host golf during the 2028 Summer Olympics.

Palisades Highlands

The Palisades Highlands is a neighborhood in Los Angeles, California's Pacific Palisades northern region, located in the upper Santa Ynez Canyon. The Highlands has access to several Topanga State Park trailheads. The Highlands themself have a number of gated communities, housing developments and distinct neighborhoods including the following:

Country Estates- a gated community of 80 homes on the farthest west part of the Highlands.
The Summit- the newest neighborhood in the Highlands that was completed in the early 2000s. This area includes The Summit Club which is a recreation center.
Lower Highlands- includes homes and condominiums as well as a shopping center and various commercial properties, development of which began in the early 1970s.

Santa Monica Canyon 

With winding roads and steep canyon walls this small enclave is home to musicians, movie stars, and aging beach bums. Santa Monica Canyon, named for the historic Rancho Boca de Santa Monica, is within the city of Los Angeles and is considered part of the Los Angeles community of Pacific Palisades. Canyon Charter School in Santa Monica Canyon is one of the most prestigious elementary schools in the Los Angeles Unified School District (LAUSD). The northwestern border of Santa Monica Canyon is Chautauqua Boulevard. The southern border is Adelaide Drive.

Demographics

Parks and recreation

City parks
The Los Angeles Department of Recreation and Parks operates several recreational facilities in Pacific Palisades.

 Palisades Park, at 851 Alma Real Drive, has  of land and is the Palisades largest park. The Palisades Recreation Center, also at that address, has barbecue pits, four baseball diamonds (two lighted, two unlighted), lighted basketball courts (indoor and outdoor), a children's play area, a football field, an indoor gymnasium (no weights are offered), picnic tables, lighted tennis courts, and lighted volleyball courts. The facility also has a kitchen, a stage, a television area, and various scheduled athletic and non-athletic activities. The Pacific Palisades Tennis Court, also at that address, has eight courts.
 Rustic Canyon Park is located along Rustic Canyon Road. The Rustic Canyon Pool is located at 601 Latimer Road. The Rustic Canyon Recreation Center, located at the same address, has a multipurpose with a capacity of 150 people that can be used as an auditorium, a gymnasium, or a volleyball court. The center also has barbecue pits, an unlighted baseball diamond, basketball courts (lighted indoor and unlighted outdoor), a children's play area, an indoor gymnasium (no weights are offered), picnic tables, and volleyball courts (lighted and unlighted).
 Temescal Canyon Park is a non-staffed "pocket park" located along Temescal Canyon Drive from Pacific Coast Highway to Sunset Blvd. The park has barbecue pits, a children's play area, picnic tables, hiking trails, a native garden, and toilets.
 Santa Ynez Canyon Park is located at Palisades Drive and Avenida de Santa Ynez.
 Rivas Canyon Park is located at the east terminus of Oracle Place.

Hiking trails

Hiking is common in the Palisades, and the community is home to a number of hiking trails including the following trails:

Backbone Trail

The Backbone Trail is a long distance trail extending 67.79 miles (109.10 km) across the length of the Santa Monica Mountains. The Backbone Trail runs through both Malibu and Pacific Palisades, with its western terminus in Point Mugu State Park in Malibu and its eastern terminus in Will Rogers State Historic Park in Pacific Palisades. The trail is open to hikers throughout its length; dogs, mountain bicyclists and horseback riders are allowed on portions of the trail as posted. The Backbone Trail follows a well-maintained, single-track path with some dirt roads along the route. There is no permit required for hiking the BBT.

Bushwacker's Delight
Bushwacker's Delight is a 0.8 mile lightly-trafficked point-to-point trail with 528 ft in elevation gain, located within Will Rogers State Historic Park. This trail is frequented by more-experienced hikers as Bushwacker's Delight is an uncleared trail with overgrown vegetation.

Eagle Springs Fire Road Loop Trail

Eagle Springs Fire Road Loop Trail is a 5.5 mile-long loop trail with 1,095 ft in elevation gain, located near the Palisades Highlands neighborhood. The trail is paved and well-maintained as it doubles as a fire road, and offers a number of activity options. It is most popular from September until May. This is one of the few trails in Los Angeles County which is open to those on horseback. This trail offers parking in the nearby lot for $10 a day, and is easily accessible from both the Palisades as well as neighboring Topanga. The Eagle Springs Fire Road Loop Trail leads to Eagle Rock, a rock formation which is a common spot for photography as its peak offers sweeping views of the surrounding area and is home to a variety of native lizards.

High Point Trail
High Point Trail is 2.8 mile-long trail with 1,007 ft of elevation gain located in the Santa Monica Mountains overlooked the Palisades. High Point Trail is a paved trail that begins on private property, and hikers hiking this trail frequently trespass knowingly or unknowingly in order to complete the hike. This trail is noted for its wildlife, and although the trail is paved some parts are overgrown with bushes and other vegetation. The trail leads to "Goat Peak" which is of the highest points in the Palisades and offers sweeping views of the surrounding area.

Inspiration Point Trail
Inspiration Point Trail is a 2.1 mile-long hiking trail with 324 ft in elevation gain located within Will Rogers State Historic Park near the Riviera neighborhood. This is one of the oldest hiking trails in Los Angeles and was created by Will Rogers in the early 20th century. Inspiration Point is one of the few hiking trails in the Palisades which is open to dogs. Inspiration Point Trail is one of the main attractions of Will Rogers State Park, and attracts hikers from across the Palisades and around the area as it is an easy hike with unique vistas of the Los Angeles Basin and Santa Monica Bay. On a clear day one can see views of areas such as Catalina Island, Chino Hills, and Saddleback Peak at the summit of this trail. Inspiration Point Trail also connects to the nearby Backbone Trail.

Los Leones Trail
Los Leones Trail, also known as Los Liones, is a moderately-challenging hiking trail located in the Castellammare neighborhood. Los Leones Trail is 7.3 miles in length, with over 1,300 ft in elevation gain. . Often spelled "Los Liones," the area is named after the mountain lions that are common in the area.

Los Leones is one of the most-popular hiking trails in the entire Westside, and the trail weaves through a lush canyon with abundant green vegetation located in the southern end of Topanga State Park, just a 1/3 mile away from the Pacific Ocean. The ivy and chaparral-lined trail offers some of the best  of Santa Monica Bay. After 1.3 miles and 550 feet of elevation gain, Los Liones Trail arrives at a clearing on a ridge with a bench that looks down on the Palisades, Santa Monica city and bay, and the surrounding area. The top of this hiking trail joins East Topanga Fire Road, which leads to the Paseo Miramar Trail which leads you deeper into the Santa Monica Mountains. Continuing on the trail you will reach "Parker Mesa Overlook", which is known for offering some of the best views of the coast of any hiking trail in Los Angeles. the area consists of a flat plateau area with sweeping views of the coastline.

Murphy Ranch Trail
Murphy Ranch Trail

Skull Rock Loop
Skull Rock Loop is a 4-mile-long loop trail with 1,141 ft of elevation gain located near the Temescal Canyon neighborhood. This trail is frequented by both rock climbers and birders, as it is home to both rocky terrain and an abundance of different bird species. Skull Rock Loop branches off from the nearby Temescal Canyon Trail, and features a waterfall as well as its namesake "Skull Rock" which is rock formation names for its resemblance to a skull. The entrance to the trail offers free street parking or a daily rate in the nearby parking lot for $12.

Trailer Canyon Fire Road
Trailer Canyon Fire Road is a 4.3 mile-long trail with 925 ft in elevation gain located near the Summit development in the Palisades Highlands neighborhood. This trail is wide and paved as it doubles as a fire road, it is also used by mountain bikers and birdwatchers. After 1.5 miles this trail connects with the nearby Temescal Ridge Trail, which takes hikers to the Temescal Gateway Park. Trailer Canyon Fire Road has views of the ocean and Temescal Canyon.

Will Rogers Trail
Will Rogers Trail is a 4.1 mile trail with 449 ft in elevation gain located within Will Rogers State Historic Park. This trail is one of many trails located within the Will Rogers State Park, near the Riviera neighborhood. Will Rogers Trail is known for being very challenging even for experienced hikers, as it is not very well-maintained, and there are signs on portions of the trail which point this out. Those hiking this trail may have to scramble on stones through the underbrush to avoid falling into the nearby creek. During the winter months the creek often overflows its banks, obscuring the trail and making this trail even more treacherous.

State parks and beaches
The California Department of Parks and Recreation also has locations in Pacific Palisades.

Will Rogers State Beach
Will Rogers State Beach extends  along the shore. The beach features swimming and skin diving.  Facilities include volleyball courts, playground and gymnastic equipment, as well as a bike path and walkway. A number of movies and TV shows have been filmed at this beach. The beach is located off the Pacific Coast Highway, near the intersection with Temescal Canyon Road. The beach is operated by the County of Los Angeles Department of Beaches & Harbors.

Will Rogers State Historic Park

While Will Rogers made Beverly Hills his home in the late 1920s, in 1922 he bought a large plot of almost  of land above Sunset Blvd. to build a weekend cottage. He built a polo field on the property in 1926, and in 1928 he and his family made it their home. In 1944, nine years after Rogers died, the ranch became a state park. In the interest of historical preservation, the home is maintained as it was including the furniture and fixtures. It is open to the public most days with the exception of major holidays, although admission is required. The top of the property's trail includes vistas of the ocean and city.

Temescal Gateway Park

Temescal Gateway Park, located at 15601 Sunset Blvd., encompasses  of oak and sycamore canyons, ridgetop views, and access to miles of trails in Topanga State Park, Will Rogers State Historic Park, and the  “Big Wild.”

Topanga State Park
Located in the cliffs and canyons of the Santa Monica Mountains and headquartered in nearby Topanga Canyon, Topanga State Park features  of trails through open grassland, live oaks and views of the Pacific Ocean. The park is bound on the south by Pacific Palisades and Brentwood, on the west by Topanga Canyon, and on the east by Rustic Canyon. Numerous geologic formations can be found in the park, including earthquake faults, marine fossils, volcanic intrusions, and a wide variety of sedimentary formations. Trail heads into the park are located throughout Pacific Palisades, including Las Lions Drive, Palisades Highlands, Temescal Gateway Park and Will Rogers State Historic Park.

Government and infrastructure
The most important civic group within the Palisades is the Pacific Palisades Community Council. The Pacific Palisades Community Council usually meets twice each month to discuss a wide range of issues that affect its residents. The council has rejected city offers to become an official part of the city, preferring its independent, non-aligned status. Among the main reasons that Council members cite is that the council would not have the power to appeal decisions of City officials, commissions, and boards and the council could not appear before Federal, State, and County authorities regarding local issues.

Local government
The community is within District 11 of the Los Angeles City Council, represented by Mike Bonin.

The Los Angeles Fire Department operates two fire stations serving Pacific Palisades. Station 69 at 15045 West Sunset Boulevard serves Pacific Palisades and the Pacific Coast. Station 23 at 17281 West Sunset Boulevard serves the Palisades Highlands, Castellammare, and the Pacific Coast.

The Los Angeles Police Department operates the West Los Angeles Community Police Station at 1663 Butler Avenue, serving the neighborhood.

County, state, and federal representation
Pacific Palisades is within Los Angeles County's 3rd Supervisorial District. As of 2014, Sheila Kuehl represents the district.

The Los Angeles County Department of Health Services SPA 5 West Area Health Office serves Pacific Palisades. The department operates the Simms/Mann Health and Wellness Center in Santa Monica, serving Pacific Palisades.

Pacific Palisades is a part of California's 50th State Assembly district. As of 2019, Richard Bloom represents the district. Pacific Palisades is also a part of California's 23rd State Senate district; as of 2019, Ben Allen represents the district. The community is a part of the State Board of Equalization District 4, represented by Mike Schaefer, as of 2019.

In the U.S. House of Representatives, Pacific Palisades is within California's 33rd congressional district, and is currently represented by Ted Lieu. The United States Postal Service operates the Pacific Palisades Post Office, at 15243 La Cruz Drive.

Fire service
Los Angeles Fire Department Stations 23 and 69 serve the area. Station 23 is located on Sunset Boulevard at the bottom of Los Liones Drive and Station 69 is located on Sunset Boulevard and Carey Street.

Law enforcement and security
Pacific Palisades is served by the West Los Angeles Division of the Los Angeles Police Department. One police car is generally assigned to the neighborhood. Palisades Patrol, a private security company, is contracted by the city and supplements the police presence and provides security for the Palisades. Many residents also rely on private security companies such as ADT, or ACS security.

Politics

Pacific Palisades is a heavily Democratic area, and Democrats tend to win the majority of the vote in each election.

2020 election results

According to a representative from the Los Angeles County Clerk, the results of the 2020 general election in the Pacific Palisades are as follows:

The final vote tally for the Presidential election Pacific Palisades was 12,219 votes cast for the winner Joe Biden and 3,861 votes cast for then-incumbent Donald Trump, a more than 8,000 vote margin in Biden's favor.

The final vote tally for the District Attorney election in Pacific Palisades was 5,795 cast for then-incumbent Jackie Lacey and 6,878 votes cast for challenger George Gascon.

2020 results by neighborhood

The Alphabet Streets
There were 349 people who cast their vote in person and 2,042 who cast their vote using mail-in ballots.

Residents of this neighborhood preferred Biden by a wide margin, casting 1804 votes in his favor compared to 403 votes that were cast for Trump. For the LA District Attorney's election, residents preferred progressive challenger George Gascón by a narrower margin over then-incumbent DA Jackie Lacey, who received 991 votes compared to the 1,143 received by Gascón.

Proposition 15, which would have taxed properties based on current market value rather than the purchase price, was defeated by just 23 votes, 1,131 to 1,154. (Statewide it was defeated 52 percent to 48 percent.)

Proposition 16, which would have repealed a constitutional provision that made it illegal to discriminate against or grant preferential treatment based on race, lost statewide but was favored in this precinct, 1,164 to 1,093. (Statewide, the yes vote was 42.8 percent and the no vote was 57.2 percent.)

Proposition 19, which allows homeowners over 55, disabled or wildfire victims to transfer primary resident's tax base to replacement residence, was passed statewide (51.1 percent majority), but not by residents in the Alphabet precinct, who voted against it 1,234 to 1,005.

Proposition 22, the “Uber” bill, which allowed app-based drivers as contractors, not employees, saw residents vote 1,179 to 1,100 in favor. The measure was also approved statewide, 58.6 percent to 41.4 percent.  (It was the most expensive ballot-measure campaign in the state's history, to date at $225,036,046.)

Proposition 25, which asked to approve replacing cash bail, and received 56.4 percent of the state voting no, saw people in the Alphabets voting to end it with a yes vote of 1,150 to 1,065. (The proposition was opposed statewide by 55.4 percent of voters.)

Castellammare
There were 302 people who cast their vote in person and 1,850 who cast their vote using mail-in ballots.

Residents of this neighborhood preferred Biden by a wide margin, casting 1,573 votes in his favor compared to 508 votes that were cast for Trump. For the LA District Attorney's election, residents preferred progressive challenger George Gascón by a narrower margin over then-incumbent DA Jackie Lacey, who received 783 votes compared to the 1,074 received by Gascón.

Prop. 15 passed here 1,051 to 1,026.

Prop. 16 saw 1,036 vote yes and 1,001 vote no.

Prop. 19 lost 914 to 1,128.

Prop. 22 passed 1,082 to 970.

Prop. 25, 1026 voted to do away with cash bail, 1005 said no.

The Huntington
There were 282 people who cast their vote in person and 1,900 who cast their vote using mail-in ballots

Residents of this neighborhood preferred Biden by a wide margin, casting 1,558 votes in his favor compared to 552 votes that were cast for Trump. For the LA District Attorney's election, residents preferred progressive challenger George Gascón by a narrower margin over then-incumbent DA Jackie Lacey, who received 801 votes compared to the 1,060 received by Gascón.

Prop. 15, taxing properties based on current market value. was defeated with 934 (yes) and 1,138 no.

Prop. 16, repealing the discrimination provision, was defeated 971 (yes) to 1,004 (no).

Prop. 19, primary tax transfer, 771 (yes) to 1,256 (no).

Prop. 22, the “Uber” bill, passed 1071 (yes) to 973 (no).

Prop. 25, seeking to replace cash bail, was defeated 971 (yes) to 1044 (no)

Lower Marquez and the Via Bluffs
There were 298 people who cast their vote in person and 2,178 who cast their vote using mail-in ballots.

Residents of this neighborhood preferred Biden by a wide margin, casting 1,872 votes in his favor compared to 512 votes that were cast for Trump. For the LA District Attorney's election, residents preferred progressive challenger George Gascón by a narrower margin over then-incumbent DA Jackie Lacey, who received 933 votes compared to the 1,205 received by Gascón.

Proposition 15, which would have taxed properties based on current market value rather than the purchase price, was defeated by one vote: 1,186 to 1,185.

Proposition 16, repealing the constitutional provision, which makes it illegal to discriminate (and voted against statewide), found favor here: 1,199 to 1,128.

Proposition 19, allowing those over 55 to transfer primary tax to replacement residence (and passed statewide), went down 953 to 1,373 to 953.

Proposition 22, the “Uber” bill, also suffered a defeat here: 1,178 to 1,165, but passed statewide.

Proposition 25, to replace cash bail, found a slim margin in favor here: 1,150 to 1,141.

Palisades Highlands
There were 316 people who cast their vote in person and 2,111 who cast their vote using mail-in ballots.

Residents of this neighborhood preferred Biden by a wide margin, casting 1,611 votes in his favor compared to 727 votes that were cast for Trump. For the LA District Attorney's election, this was the only neighborhood in the Palisades where residents voted for Lacey than Gascón, who received 983 votes compared to the 1,080 received by Lacey.

Prop. 15 went down here 993 to 1,332.

Prop. 16, Highlands residents also voted against repealing the discrimination provision, 989 to 1,306.

Prop. 19 lost 991 to 1,274.

Prop. 21 passed 1,353 to 951.

Prop. 25 had 1,007 vote to do away with cash bail, 1,248 vote against the idea.

Paseo Miramar and Upper Marquez
There were 330 people who cast their vote in person and 2,422 who cast their vote using mail-in ballots

Residents of this neighborhood preferred Biden by a wide margin, casting 1,945 votes in his favor compared to 682 votes that were cast for Trump. For the LA District Attorney's election, residents preferred progressive challenger George Gascón by a narrower margin over then-incumbent DA Jackie Lacey, who received 1,135 votes compared to the 1,232 received by Gascón.

Prop. 15, taxing properties based on current market value, was defeated 1,154 yes to 1.478 no.

Prop. 16, repealing the discrimination provision, was defeated 1,226 yes to 1,370 no.

Prop. 19, allowing the residential property tax to transfer, also lost 1,099 yes to 1462 no.

Prop. 22, the “Uber” bill, passed 1,483 yes to 1,132 no.

Prop. 25, seeking to replace cash bail, was defeated 1,192 yes to 1,337 no.

The Riviera
There were 302 people who cast their vote in person and 1,850 who cast their vote using mail-in ballots.

Residents of this neighborhood preferred Biden, casting 1,856 votes in his favor compared to 477 votes that were cast for Trump. For the LA District Attorney's election, residents preferred progressive challenger George Gascón over then-incumbent DA Jackie Lacey, who receives 855 votes compared to the 1,255 received by Gascón.

Prop. 15 was defeated 1,125 in favor and 1,203 against.

Prop. 16 found favor here: 1,257 to 1,022 (although defeated statewide).

Prop. 19 lost 955 to 1,318.

Prop. 22 passed by one vote, 1,153 to 1,152.

Prop. 25 passed here: 1,162 to 1,095 (although defeated statewide).

Education

Public schools

Residents are zoned to Los Angeles Unified School District schools. The area is within Board District 4. As of 2017, Nick Melvoin represents the district.

Some residents are assigned to Pacific Palisades Elementary School, some residents are assigned to Canyon Elementary School, and some are assigned to Marquez Elementary School. All residents are zoned to Paul Revere Charter Middle School and Palisades Charter High School.

 Canyon Elementary School opened in 1910.
 Pacific Palisades Elementary opened in 1922.

 Marquez Elementary School opened in 1955.

Paul Revere Middle School first opened as Palisades-Brentwood Junior High School on September 12, 1955; it chose its current name during its first year of operation. It became an internal charter in 1994.
 Palisades Charter High School, commonly known as "Pali High", opened in 1961. Pali High later became a charter school in 1994.

Private schools
Private schools in the area include:
 Palisades Jewish Early Childhood Center (preschool-kindergarten) – is a Jewish private school associated with the Chabad movement offering private preschool, kindergarten, daycare and Hebrew school education.
 Calvary Christian (K–8)
 Village School (pre-K–6)
 Corpus Christi (K–8)
 St. Matthew's Parish School (PS–8)
 Seven Arrows (K–6)
 Westside Waldorf (K–8)
 Lycée Français de Los Angeles Pacific Palisades Campus

Public libraries

Los Angeles Public Library operates the Palisades Branch at 861 Alma Real Drive.

Culture

Menorah lighting

Beginning in 1988, each year on the first night of Hanukkah a public menorah lighting ceremony is held at the Palisades Village, the downtown area of the Palisades. The menorah lighting is organized by Chabad of Pacific Palisades as well as other leaders in the local Jewish community, and the Pacific Palisades Chamber of Commerce. It is hosted by Palisades Chabad Rabbi Zushe Cunin, as well as the honorary mayor, the city councilman representing the area, and local developer Rick Caruso. It is accompanied by a community event featuring live Hanukkah music, complimentary Hanukkah foods such as latkes, chocolate gelt and sufganiyot, Hanukkah-themed arts and crafts, face painting and balloon twisting.

On December 2, 2018, the 30th Annual Pacific Palisades Menorah Lighting was held at its new location, the Palisades Village shopping center. This was the highest-attended menorah lighting in Palisades history and was attended by over 1,000 people, including actors and Co-honorary Mayors Janice and Billy Crystal, Rabbi Zushe Cunin, Palisades Village developer Rick Caruso, and councilman Mike Bonin. The Crystals also helped in the planning of the event. The event performances of Hanukkah and other traditional Jewish music by the Marquez Elementary Choir, Paul Revere Music Club and the Westside Waldorf School.

Pacific Palisades is also home to one of the few vegan Hanukkah celebrations in Los Angeles, "Lights and Latkes", hosted by vegan Rabbi Jonathan Klein and JewishVeg Los Angeles.

Palisades Rocks The Fourth!

Palisades Rocks The Fourth is a Palisadian tradition that first began in 1967. Every Fourth of July, the community's Chamber of Commerce sponsors day-long events which include 5K and 10K runs, a home decorating contest, a parade down Sunset Boulevard, and a concert accompanied by a fireworks display at Palisades High School baseball field.

Due to the COVID-19 pandemic, Palisades Rocks The Fourth! was held mostly virtually beginning in 2020. A virtual concert accompanied by fireworks and a flyover by World War II fighter pilots flying AT-6 fighter jets over the Palisades.

Synagogues
The Pacific Palisades is home to a large Jewish population and has a number of synagogues including the following:

Chabad of Pacific Palisades- local Chabad center located at 17315 Sunset Blvd in the Castlellammare neighborhood, offering religious services, Hebrew school and early Jewish education. Chabad of the Palisades hosts a number of Jewish events, and is also responsible for the annual Menorah lighting and Hanukkah celebration at the Palisades Village.
Kehillat Israel- Reconstructionist synagogue, this is the oldest synagogue in the Palisades.

Sports and recreation

Bel Air Bay Club

The Bel-Air Bay Club is both an event venue (Upper Club) and a private beach club (Lower Club) located in the area.

The Upper Club, includes an ocean view and on-site accommodations available for private parties. The interior of the Bel-Air Bay Club Upper Club includes large windows, a fireplace, and iron chandeliers. The Bel-Air Bay Club is primarily used as a wedding, social, and corporate event venue.

Riviera Country Club

The Riviera Country Club is a private club with a championship golf course and tennis courts in the Riviera neighborhood of Pacific Palisades. It is just a block south of Sunset Boulevard.

The Riviera was designed by golf course architects George C. Thomas, Jr. and William P. Bell, it has been the primary host for the Genesis Invitational (originally the Los Angeles Open), an annual event on the PGA Tour in February. The 2021 edition was the 58th held at Riviera.

The Riviera has hosted three major championships: the U.S. Open in 1948, and the PGA Championship in 1983 and 1995. In addition, it was site of the U.S. Senior Open, a senior major, in 1998 and the U.S. Amateur in August 2017. The club is scheduled to host the Olympics in 2028.

Will Rogers Polo Club

The Will Rogers Polo Club is a polo club located at 1501 Will Rogers State Park Road, Pacific Palisades, Los Angeles, California., which is within Will Rogers State Historic Park, and is Southern California's only remaining polo club.

Media
 The Los Angeles Times is the citywide newspaper.
 The Palisadian-Post, founded in 1928, is the oldest newspaper to serve the Pacific Palisades community.
 The Palisades News, first published in 2014, is a Palisades-based newspaper published twice monthly for the residents of Pacific Palisades.
 Circling The News, is a local news site established in 2017 by Sue Perscoe, a former writer for The Palisades News, and featuring a number of guest writers and columnists.
 Perspective Palisades, is a local magazine founded by local historian and realtor Michael Edlen in 2020, the magazine is published each quarter and features real estate-related news as well as historical information, news in the community, and interviews with notable Palisadians.

Landmarks

Burns House
Architect Charles W. Moore designed his first house in Los Angeles for the UCLA economist and urban planning professor, Leland Burns. The house was completed in 1974. It occupies a narrow ledge on a steep slope of the Santa Monica canyon. The house is composed of an interlocking set of shed roofs and tower, its forms reminiscent of The Sea Ranch Condominium, but adapted for a sense of the Mediterranean climate and Hollywood allusions. An interior staircase climbs up through a vertical cleft in the narrow house, and then at the very top of the third story, the stair descends outside, back down into a swimming pool court. Designer Tina Beebe developed with Moore the color scheme, whereby exterior planes were painted in a range of ochres, pinks, roses, and golds, so as the light and shade shifts during the day, the house itself seems to change like a chameleon. The house was built around a tracker organ hand built by Jürgen Ahrend, an instrument known as Opus 1, U.S.A.

Bradbury House

The Bradbury House is a historic house in the Huntington Palisades neighborhood. It was designed in the Spanish Revival style by architect John Byers, and completed in 1923. The home was built for Lewis L Bradbury Jr whose father, Lewis L Bradbury, commissioned the construction of the Bradbury Building in Downtown Los Angeles. It has been listed on the National Register of Historic Places since March 22, 2010.

Business Block

The Business Block building is a historic building located in the Palisades downtown area called the Village. It serves as the anchor of the downtown area, and was designed by architect Clifton Nourse and dedicated in 1924. The Business Block building is located between Antioch, Swarthmore and Sunset in the Village neighborhood of Pacific Palisades, an area in the Westside of Los Angeles, California.

Dolores del Río House

The Dolores Del Rio House is located at 757 Kingman Avenue was designed for Mexican-American actress Dolores del Río and her husband, production designer Cedric Gibbons, by architects Douglas Honnold and George Vernon Russell in 1929.

Eames House

Eames House is the 1949 home and studio of husband-and-wife design pioneers Charles and Ray Eames.

The Getty Villa

The Getty Villa is an educational center and museum dedicated to the study of the arts and cultures of Ancient Greece, Rome, and Etruria.

Gladstones

Gladstones is a seafood restaurant located along Will Rogers State Beach on Pacific Coast Highway. Despite its name Gladstones Malibu is located in Pacific Palisades, it is not actually located within the Malibu city limits. Gladstones is known for their seafood and is a tourist attraction. It has been owned by Richard Riordan, former Mayor of Los Angeles, since the mid-1990s. In 2008, Gladstones was the 37th highest grossing independent restaurant in the country. In 2009, the private company SBE assumed day-to-day operations as part of a management contract with Riordan which expired in 2014. Gladstone's re-assumed management of day-to-day operations thereafter. The beachfront restaurant has undergone several name changes. When Robert J. Morris opened the restaurant at the site of Ted's Grill, he named it Gladstone's 4 Fish. The restaurant is frequently cited as Gladstone's. It is now called simply Gladstones.

Kappe Residence

The Kappe Residence is a house located in the Rustic Canyon section of Pacific Palisades, that was designed by architect Raymond Kappe, FAIA, and was intended to be his own private residence. The house is a modern design built into a heavily treed hillside. The Kappe Residence was designated a Los Angeles Historic-Cultural Monument in 1996, and in 2008 it was named one of the top ten houses in Los Angeles by an expert panel selected by the Los Angeles Times.

Mort's Palisades Deli

Mort's Palisades Deli, more commonly referred to as Mort's Deli, was a Jewish delicatessen located at 1035 Swarthmore Ave on the corner of Sunset Boulevard in the Village. Mort's was a neighborhood fixture and local landmark, which first opened in 1972 and closed in 2008 upon the buildings sale to former mayor Richard Riordan, who closed the deli to make way for a bistro, which itself closed after a few months. The deli was known for their Reuben sandwiches and celebrity clientele including Larry David, Walter Matthau, and Larry King among others, as well as being featured in numerous episodes of Curb Your Enthusiasm as "Leo's Deli".

Old Santa Monica Forestry Station

The Old Santa Monica Forestry Station is the nation's first experimental forestry station, built in 1887. The Old Santa Monica Forestry Station was designated a California Historic Landmark (No.840) on March 20, 1970. Old Santa Monica Forestry Station is located in the Rustic Canyon neighborhood of Pacific Palisades. It is south of what is now called Santa Monica Mountains National Recreation Area. The hills and canyons around the Santa Monica Canyon were a land boom in the late 1880s. In 1971 the state placed a marker near the entrance of the Rustic Canyon Recreation Center at the NW corner of Latimer and Hilltree Roads, at 601 Latimer Road; which reads:

Self-Realization Fellowship Lake Shrine

Self-Realization Fellowship Lake Shrine is a spiritual center on Sunset Boulevard founded in 1950 by Paramahansa Yogananda, whose classic book “Autobiography of a Yogi” introduced many Westerners to yoga and Eastern mysticism.

Thomas Mann House

Thomas Mann House was Thomas Mann's home during his exile from 1942 to 1952 designed by JR Davidson.

Villa Aurora

Villa Aurora is an artists residence and historic landmark located in the former home of exiled German-Jewish writer Lion Feuchtwanger and his wife Marta.

Wildlife

Pacific Palisades is home to a variety of species of wildlife, both native to the area and introduced from elsewhere.

Wild Parrots

Pacific Palisades has been noted for its large population of California wild parrots, and is one of the main areas in Southern California where wild parrots can be found. Parrots mainly live in the sycamore-lined canyons of the Palisades. Wild parrots have lived in the Palisades since the 1960s, and are said to descend from pet parrots that were released by their owners in the area in the wake of the 1961 Bel Air fire, and the closing of Busch Gardens in Van Nuys.

Pacific Palisades is home to numerous species of parrots, and the most commonly-sighted species is the Nanday parakeet. Other species of parrots found in the Palisades include the mitred parakeet, yellow-chevroned parakeet, white-winged parakeet, rose-ringed parakeet, red-masked parakeet, blue-crowned parakeet, red-crowned parrot, lilac-crowned parrot, white-fronted parrot, blue-fronted parrot, yellow-headed parrot, and the red-lored parrot.

In popular culture
 Jerry Lewis lived on Amalfi Drive in Pacific Palisades during the 1950s. He shot several Gar-Ron Productions home movies at that house with neighbors Tony Curtis and Janet Leigh. He became the honorary mayor of the Palisades in 1953.
 The Beach Boys 1963 hit "Surfin' U.S.A." mentions Pacific Palisades in its list of Southern California surf spots.
 The 1976 book, What Really Happened to the Class of '65? is about members of one of Palisades High School's early graduating classes and how their once-privileged lives turned out years later, often disastrously. The book, by author David Wallechinsky, the son of novelist Irving Wallace, and his "Pali" classmate, film critic Michael Medved, described Pacific Palisades as a microcosm of America during the tumultuous Summer of Love era.
 The West Coast Avengers, a California-based branch of the Marvel Comics superhero team, were depicted as based out of an estate in Pacific Palisades.
 Pacific Palisades, a 1997 TV series produced by Aaron Spelling, was named after the area.
The characters on the teen show Saved by the Bell (1989–1993) mention on several occasions that their school is located in Pacific Palisades.
Popular show 90210 mentions Palisades High as their rivals and has filmed some episodes on the beach and at a local restaurant, Cafe Vida.
British alternative rock band Ash included a song entitled "Pacific Palisades" on their 2001 album Free All Angels.
Rapper Childish Gambino mentions Pacific Palisades in his song IV. Sweatpants saying, "got a glass house in the Palisades."
In Modern Family, the Dunphy children attend Palisades Charter High School. Alex Dunphy was crowned school valedictorian in the episode "Patriot Games."
The main character of the TV series Transparent lives in a house in Pacific Palisades.
untitled 02 – 06.23.2014., the second track of Kendrick Lamar's 2016 compilation album untitled unmastered, mentions the area in the third verse: "Palisade views with some sex."
The Hyundai Palisade is named after Pacific Palisades.

Filming locations
 Some scenes of Prizzi's Honor were filmed at 15025 Corona Del Mar. The house has since been demolished.
 Havoc was set in the Palisades and filmed at Palisades Charter High School.
 The 2003 Disney film Freaky Friday with Jamie Lee Curtis and Lindsay Lohan was filmed at Palisades Charter High School.
 The 2001 film Crazy/Beautiful starring Kirsten Dunst was filmed at Palisades Charter High School.
 The house used for the exterior shots of the Pearson residence in the 1979 film Phantasm is located at 1232 Corsica Drive in Pacific Palisades.
 Black Flag's "Slip It In" music video was filmed at Palisades High School.
 The 1977 NBC television program James at 16, starring Lance Kerwin, was filmed at the same school, which was then called Palisades High School, or more commonly "Pali High".
 The 1976 film Carrie was filmed at Palisades High School.
 The 1957 film No Down Payment has several sequences around Pacific Palisades posing as a Los Angeles suburb.
 Food Network's Everyday Italian is filmed on El Medio.
 The TV series Baywatch was filmed at Lifeguard Headquarters by tower 15 of Will Rogers State Beach in Pacific Palisades.
 The TV series The Rockford Files was often filmed in and around the Palisades in the 1970s.
 The TV series Popular filmed at Palisades Charter High School.
 The TV series Modern Family filmed some scenes at Palisades Charter High School.
 The first-season residence of the television series The Golden Girls was a home in Pacific Palisades. For subsequent seasons, a facade house was built on the Disney/MGM back lot.
 The HBO series Curb Your Enthusiasm is filmed in the real-life Pacific Palisades residence of Larry David, as the home of his character, "Larry David".
The TV series Teen Wolf was filmed at Palisades Charter High School.
The original 2014 movie God's Not Dead had scenes filmed at 1033 Ravoli Drive in Pacific Palisades.
The 2014 movie Redeemed, starring Pacific Palisades resident Ted McGinley, also was filmed at 1033 Ravoli Drive.
An episode of HBO's Silicon Valley was filmed in the Palisades Highlands at 1268 Piedra Morada Drive. It was used as the home of “Big Head” after he became rich.

Notable peopleSee List of people from Pacific Palisades, Los Angeles See also 

 List of districts and neighborhoods of Los Angeles
 Old Santa Monica Forestry Station in Pacific Palisades.

References

Further reading
 Young, Betty Lou, Pacific Palisades: Where the Mountains Meet the Sea'' , Pacific Palisades Historical Society Press (1983)

External links

Pacific Palisades Chamber of Commerce
Pacific Palisades Community Council

 
Neighborhoods in Los Angeles
Populated places in the Santa Monica Mountains
Populated places established in 1922
Westside (Los Angeles County)
Populated coastal places in California